Coleophora sternipennella is a moth of the family Coleophoridae. It is found in all of Europe, except Greece and the Mediterranean islands. It is also known from the Caucasus. It occurs in steppe and desert biotopes, in wasteland and uncultivated parts of anthropogenic areas.

Adult are on wing from July to August in western Europe.

The mouth angle is 20-25°. The case is roughened by sand particles giving it a greyish yellow colour. It has vague length lines. Young larvae make a mine, from where a youth case is cut. After this, some small fleck mines are made. Finally, the larvae lives in the inflorescence, feeding on the developing fruits. Larvae can be found from September. They overwinter as a larva before pupating in June.

References

sternipennella
Leaf miners
Moths described in 1839
Moths of Europe
Taxa named by Johan Wilhelm Zetterstedt